The Fall of the Krays is a 2016 low-budget British crime film directed by Zackary Adler and written by Ken and Sebastian Brown based on the true story of Ronnie and Reggie Kray. The film serves as the sequel to The Rise of the Krays.

Cast
 Simon Cotton as Ronnie Kray
 Kevin Leslie as Reggie Kray
 Josh Myers as Frankie Fraser
 James Hepburn as Charlie Richardson
 Dan Parr as Teddy Smith
 George Webster as The Author
 Alexa Morden as Lisa
 Adrian Bouchet as Frank
 Martin Ross as Police Commissioner John Du Rose
 Phil Dunster as Dickie Baker

References

External links
 
 

2016 films
2010s crime films
British crime films
Hood films
British sequel films
Crime films based on actual events
2010s English-language films
Films directed by Zackary Adler
2010s American films
2010s British films